Congressional Country Club is a country club and golf course in Bethesda, Maryland, United States. Congressional opened in 1924 and its Blue Course has hosted five major championships, including three U.S. Opens and a PGA Championship. It was a biennial stop on the PGA Tour, with the Quicken Loans National hosted by Tiger Woods until 2020. Previously, Congressional hosted the former Kemper Open until its move to nearby TPC at Avenel in 1987. Congressional hosted its third U.S. Open in 2011. Tournament winners at Congressional have included Rory McIlroy, Ken Venturi, Ernie Els, Justin Rose and Tiger Woods, among many others. Congressional is generally considered one of the most prestigious golf clubs in the world.

The courses
Congressional has two 18-hole golf courses: the world-renowned Blue Course and the Gold Course. The Blue Course was designed by Devereux Emmet and has been renovated over the years by numerous architects, including Donald Ross, Robert Trent Jones and prior to the 2011 U.S. Open by Rees Jones. In 2019, Andrew Green began a wholesale restoration of the Blue Course to Devereux Emmet's 1924 original design and a remodeling of the club's practice facilities.  The course was included in the Links series, and in 2011 is to be available for the Virtual Championship at World Golf Tour.

Both courses are known for their rolling terrain, tree-lined fairways, and challenging greens. Water hazards also come into play on both courses.

Blue Course

The Blue Course has hosted all of the significant golf tournaments contested at Congressional. The course is often considered among the best 100 courses in the United States; Golf Digest ranked it 89th in its 2006 listing of the 100 Greatest Golf Courses. In 2007, Golf Digest ranked it 86th in America's 100 Greatest Golf Courses. The Blue Course has been redesigned by Robert Trent Jones in 1957 and Rees Jones twice, in 1989 and 2006. The course measures  from the back tees. It is a par 72 (but plays as a par 71 for all PGA tour events, with hole 11 reduced to a par 4) with a course and slope rating of 75.4/142. Bent grass is used for the fairways and for the greens. Until renovated in 2009, Annual Bluegrass (Poa annua) was used for the greens.

18th hole
The Blue Course was originally designed to finish on a par-three 18th hole, playing over the lake to a green that finished in a natural amphitheatre below the clubhouse. The USGA has long held a dislike towards par-threes for finishing holes, as they are perceived as anticlimactic and (in most cases) do not require the player to hit an accurate tee-shot with a driver, which can sometimes be difficult to execute under the extreme pressure of a major championship.

In order to avoid such a conflict, the USGA has employed various course configurations over the years to allow tournaments to be played over the Blue Course without finishing on the par-three 18th. For the 1964 U.S. Open (and 1976 PGA Championship), as well as for the Kemper Opens played in the 1980s, two holes from the adjoining Gold Course (5th & 15th hole) were inserted into the routing in order to allow the par-four 17th hole of the Blue Course (long considered the most demanding hole on the course) to be played as the 18th instead.

During the 1995 U.S. Senior Open, it was decided to use the existing par-three 18th for the time, but it was played out of order as the 10th. However, this proved to be logistically difficult, as there was a rather long walk around the lake to get from the 9th green to the 10th tee, followed by another as the players had to double back to get to the 11th tee following completion of the 10th. The USGA broke with tradition for the 1997 U.S. Open, and played the entire Blue Course in its original order and finished with the par-3 18th, which was the first time in history that the tournament had finished on a par-three.

The USGA was unsatisfied with their experiment, as most of the drama surrounding the 1997 Open had been decided at the 17th hole. With the creation of the new tour event in 2007 as well as the upcoming 2011 U.S. Open, it was decided to solve the problem once and for all. The club voted to permanently reverse the direction of the 18th hole, and Rees Jones was brought in to design a new par-3, which now plays in the opposite direction to the old 18th. The new hole now plays as the 10th, with the rest of the routing shifted so that the original par-four 17th hole now plays as the permanent 18th. A long walk from the new 10th green to the 11th tee remains, but not nearly as far as the old configuration.

Relationship with PGA of America and 2019 Restoration of Blue Course
In 2018, the PGA of America announced that it had selected Congressional to host eight future championships in the next two decades. These championships include the 2022 and 2027 KPMG Women's PGA Championship, 2025 and 2033 KitchenAid Senior PGA Championship, 2029 PGA Professional Championship, 2024 Junior PGA Championship, 2031 PGA Championship and 2037 Ryder Cup.

Prior to hosting PGA of America championships, Congressional announced that in 2019 Keith Foster would lead a restoration of the Blue Course to Devereux Emmet's 1924 original design. However, in December 2018, the Club fired Foster before he could begin work after he pleaded guilty to illegally transporting between $250,000 and $500,000 worth of items made from endangered species, migratory birds and other wildlife. Foster was subsequently sentenced to 30 days in prison and one year of supervised release.

In 2018, Congressional Country Club was cited by the Montgomery County Department of Permitting Services for removal of over 20,000 sq. ft. of tree canopy without getting a required sediment control permit.

In February 2019, Andrew Green was hired to submit his own plan and complete the restoration of the Blue Course and a remodeling of the club's practice facilities.

Scorecard

Gold Course

The Gold Course has always been the shorter course in comparison to the Blue Course. It has been renovated twice; with George Fazio and Tom Fazio redoing the final nine holes in 1977. In 2000, the course got a complete renovation by Arthur Hills. Not only did Hills lengthen the course, he also reconstructed the tees, fairways, greens, and cart paths. The course is now as challenging as the Blue Course. It ranked 5th Greatest Golf Course in the state of Maryland according to Golf Digest Greatest Golf Courses in 2007. It now measures  from the back tees. It is a par 71 with a slope rating of 73.6/135. Bent grass is used for the fairways and Poa annua grass is used for the greens.

Scorecard

Tournaments held at Congressional

Major championships

The first major championship at Congressional was the U.S. Open in 1964, won by Ken Venturi in oppressive heat with a score of two under par in the last Open to finish with two rounds on Saturday. A dozen years later, the PGA Championship was held at Congressional in 1976. With the course playing as a par 70, 1970 champion Dave Stockton sank a par-saving putt on the 72nd hole to win his second PGA Championship by one stroke at 281 (+1). The second U.S. Open at Congressional was played in 1997. Ernie Els, the 1994 champion, won his second U.S. Open with a score of four under par. The Blue Course hosted again in 2011, and 22-year-old Rory McIlroy of Northern Ireland won his first major at 16 under par, a U.S. Open record, with a victory margin of eight shots.

Congressional has hosted one senior major, the U.S. Senior Open in 1995, won by Tom Weiskopf, four strokes ahead of runner-up Jack Nicklaus. It will host its first women's major in 2022 with the Women's PGA Championship, which is scheduled to return in 2027.

Other tournaments

The Kemper Open, later called the Booz Allen Classic, was played at Congressional eight times. Notable winners include Craig Stadler, John Mahaffey, Fred Couples, Greg Norman, and Sergio García. The 2007 AT&T National, sponsored and hosted by Tiger Woods, was played at Congressional July 5–8 and was won by K. J. Choi of South Korea.  The 2008 AT&T was played July 3–6 and won by Anthony Kim. Tiger Woods was unable to play due to surgery on his knee. The 2009 AT&T National was played July 2–5 and won by host, Tiger Woods. The 2012 playing of the AT&T National saw a much harder golf course than the U.S. Open, with only ten players finishing under par. The tournament was won once again by Tiger Woods at 8 under par. Starting in 2014, Congressional will host the renamed Quicken Loans National on even years, alternating with other venues in the D.C. area.

The course has hosted two USGA amateur golf tournaments: the U.S. Junior Amateur of 1949, won by Gay Brewer, and the U.S. Women's Amateur of 1959, won by Barbara McIntire. The 2009 U.S. Amateur had originally been scheduled to be played at Congressional, but the event was relocated in order to allow the club to make further changes to the course prior to the 2011 US Open. This scheduling change allowed for the AT&T National to be held in 2009 at Congressional.

Notable members

Founding life members included Presidents William H. Taft, Woodrow Wilson, Warren G. Harding, Calvin Coolidge and Herbert Hoover, who served as the first president of the club. Other notable members of Congressional Country Club have included:
Vincent Astor
Andrew Carnegie
Charlie Chaplin
Walter Chrysler
Dwight D. Eisenhower
Harvey S. Firestone
Gerald Ford
John Glenn
William Randolph Hearst
Vince Lombardi
James Cash Penney
John D. Rockefeller
Myron Charles Taylor
Fred Thompson
Ken Venturi

Amenities
Congressional's expansive clubhouse is the largest clubhouse in the United States. It was designed in 1924 by architect 
Philip M. Jullien (1875-1963).
Congressional Country Club has an indoor duck pin bowling alley, tennis club, grand ballroom, one indoor and a lap pool with diving boards, a kids pool and main pool, fitness center and grand foyer.  Food and Beverage outlets consist of The House Grill, The Chop House, The Founders Pub, The Pavilion, The Main Dining Room, The Stonebar, The Stop and Go, Midway House and Beverage Carts.  It also has 21 overnight guest accommodations and a paddle tennis area. It has hosted a number of famous weddings. It also has a spa, massage services, indoor Jacuzzi, men's and women's locker rooms.

World War II usage
During World War II, the Congressional Country Club was acquisitioned by America's wartime intelligence service, the Office of Strategic Services, for use as a training facility and billeting returning OSS agents from active duty overseas.

References

External links

1924 establishments in Maryland
Buildings and structures in Bethesda, Maryland
Golf clubs and courses designed by Devereux Emmet
Golf clubs and courses in Maryland
Sports venues completed in 1924
Tourist attractions in Montgomery County, Maryland